Caspoggio is a comune (municipality) in the Province of Sondrio in the Italian region Lombardy, located about  northeast of Milan and about  north of Sondrio.

References

External links
 Official website

Cities and towns in Lombardy